Sin Pepitas en la Lengua is a 2018 Panamanian comedy film directed by the brothers Carlos García de Paredes and Juan Carlos García de Paredes and starring Argentine actress Ash Olivera. The film is a remake of the Chilean film No Filtrer (Sin filtro) that premiered in 2016.

Synopsis 
Isa, who is aggravated by her life, decides to visit a non-traditional doctor. Through the use of hypnotherapy, Isa discovers that her pain is caused by repressed feelings and that the way to heal herself is to say whatever she thinks.

Cast 

 Ash Olivera as Isa Montero.
 Agustín Gonçalves as Antonio.
 Juan Carlos Garcia de Paredes as Gabriel.
 Ingrid Villareal as Ines.
 Simón Tejeira Healy as Nicolás.
 Diego de Obaldia as Pablo.
 Sara Faretra as Maricarmen.
 Camila Aybar as Andrea Alvarado.
 Miroslava Morales as Marta.
 Victor Villarreal as Carlos.
 Samuel Ibarra as Bicho.
 Randy Dominguez as Ken Lee.
 Jonathan Harker as HRKR.
 Diego Barbish as Javier.
 Cruz De Jesús Cano as Biencuidao.
 Dayana Salazar as Cony.

Production 
The filming took place in Panama City during the months of October and November 2017. It was recorded between Casco Viejo, Costa del Este and the Barrio Chino de la Central, in total, the post-production lasted 5 weeks, and the shooting 4 weeks.

Release and festivals 
The film was released commercially on August 9, 2019, It also participated in the Latino Film Market 2019 in New York City. The film has also been shortlisted to represent Panama at the 2019 Platinum Awards.

References

External links 

 

2018 films
2018 comedy films
Panamanian comedy films
2010s Spanish-language films

Films set in Panama
Films shot in Panama
Films about hypnosis
Remakes of Chilean films